Walker Brothers may refer to:
The Walker Brothers, British-based American pop music trio popular in the 1960s and 1970s
Walker Bros., American pancake house company
Walker Brothers (soap), early South Australian soap and candle manufacturer
Walker Brothers (Wigan), English rolling stock manufacturer